Princess Ana Gruzinskaya Golitsyna (17 August 1763 — 11 October 1842) was a Georgian royal princess (batonishvili) of the Bagrationi dynasty of Mukhrani branch.

Early life
She was the daughter of Prince Alexander Bagration-Gruzinsky, grandchild of Prince Bakar of Kartli and great-grandchild of King Vakhtang VI of Kartli. She had one brother, Prince Georgy Bagration-Gruzinsky. Her mother, Princess Daria Alexandrovna Menshikova, was the granddaughter of Prince Alexander Danilovich Menshikov, who was the de facto ruler of Russia from 1725–1727.

Marriage
In 1790, Ana married her third cousin once removed Prince Boris Andreevich Golitsyn, member of the House of Golitsyn, who was a close friend of Georgian general Prince Peter Bagration-Mukhransky, who was also her nephew.

Death
Ana died on 11 October 1842 in Saint Petersburg, and is buried in Coastal Monastery of St. Sergius.

Children
Princess Yelizaveta Golitsyna (1790—1870)
Prince Andrei Golitsyn (1791—1861)
Prince Alexander Golitsyn (1792—1865)
Prince Nikolai Golitsyn (1794—1866)
Princess Sofia Golitsyna (1795—1871)
Princess Tatiana Golitsyna-Potyomkina (1797—1869)
Princess Alexandra Golitsyna (1798—1876)
Princess Irina Golitsyna (1800—1802)

References
Великий князь Николай Михайлович. Петербургский некрополь / Сост. В. Саитов. В 4-х т. - СПб., 1912-1913.- Т.1. - С. 624.
Воспоминания Е. Ю. Хвощинской. — СПб., 1898. — С. 14.
Русские портреты XVIII—XIX столетий. Изд. Вел. Кн. Николая Михайловича. СПб. 1906. Т. II1, вып 1. № 17.

1763 births
1842 deaths
House of Mukhrani
Princesses from Georgia (country)
18th-century people from Georgia (country)
19th-century people from Georgia (country)
Ana